Hyde County is a county in the U.S. state of South Dakota. As of the 2020 census, the population was 1,262, making it the second-least populous county in South Dakota. Its county seat is Highmore. The county was founded in 1873, as a county of the Dakota Territory, and organized in 1883. It was named for James Hyde, a member of legislature in the 1870s.

History
Hyde County was created by the territorial legislature on January 8, 1873, with area partitioned from Buffalo County. It was not organized by that action. Its boundaries were altered by changes in October 1879 and February 1883. On November 5, 1883, the county organization was filled and the county was placed in independent operation.

The current Hyde County courthouse was constructed in 1911 (it is currently listed on the National Register of Historic Places). The county organization included a jail until 1974, when the jail was abandoned and jail-related services were contracted to surrounding counties.

Geography
The county terrain consists of semi-arid rolling hills, partly devoted to agriculture. The Missouri River flows southeastward at its SW corner, and delineates a portion of the county's south boundary line.

The terrain slopes toward the county's SW corner. Its highest point is on the lower part of its eastern boundary line, at 2,080' (634m) ASL.

Major highways
  U.S. Highway 14
  South Dakota Highway 26
  South Dakota Highway 34
  South Dakota Highway 47

Adjacent counties
 Faulk County - north
 Hand County - east
 Buffalo County - south
 Lyman County - southwest
 Hughes County - southwest
 Sully County - west
 Potter County - northwest

Protected areas
 Chapelle State Game Production Area
 Highmore State Game Production Area
 Rezac Lake State Game Production Area
 Rice Lake State Game Production Area

Lakes
 Baloun Lake
 Chapelle Lake
 Lake Boehm
 Rezac Lake
 Rice Lake
 Thomas Lake

Demographics

2000 census
As of the 2000 United States Census, there were 1,671 people, 679 households, and 456 families in the county. The population density was 2 people per square mile (1/km2). There were 769 housing units at an average density of 0.9 per square mile (0.3/km2). The racial makeup of the county was 91.08% White, 0.12% Black or African American, 7.96% Native American, 0.12% Pacific Islander, 0.12% from other races, and 0.60% from two or more races.  0.48% of the population were Hispanic or Latino of any race.

There were 679 households, out of which 29.60% had children under the age of 18 living with them, 55.70% were married couples living together, 6.00% had a female householder with no husband present, and 32.80% were non-families. 30.30% of all households were made up of individuals, and 17.10% had someone living alone who was 65 years of age or older. The average household size was 2.41 and the average family size was 3.00.

The county population contained 25.60% under the age of 18, 5.80% from 18 to 24, 23.50% from 25 to 44, 22.70% from 45 to 64, and 22.30% who were 65 years of age or older. The median age was 42 years. For every 100 females there were 102.10 males. For every 100 females age 18 and over, there were 97.00 males.

The median income for a household in the county was $31,103, and the median income for a family was $40,700. Males had a median income of $24,728 versus $18,833 for females. The per capita income for the county was $16,356. About 7.80% of families and 12.30% of the population were below the poverty line, including 13.40% of those under age 18 and 13.70% of those age 65 or over.

2010 census
As of the 2010 United States Census, there were 1,420 people, 600 households, and 385 families in the county. The racial makeup of the county was 89.1% white, 8.5% American Indian, 0.2% Asian, 0.1% Pacific islander, 0.1% black or African American, 0.2% from other races, and 1.9% from two or more races. Those of Hispanic or Latino origin made up 1.1% of the population. In terms of ancestry,

Of the 600 households, 26.2% had children under the age of 18 living with them, 53.7% were married couples living together, 5.5% had a female householder with no husband present, 35.8% were non-families, and 33.0% of all households were made up of individuals. The average household size was 2.30 and the average family size was 2.92. The median age was 46.4 years.

The median income for a household in the county was $41,196 and the median income for a family was $61,161. Males had a median income of $36,053 versus $28,456 for females. The per capita income for the county was $22,995. About 8.3% of families and 11.2% of the population were below the poverty line, including 11.6% of those under age 18 and 14.1% of those age 65 or over.

Communities

City
Highmore (county seat)

Census-designated place 
Stephan

Townships

Banner
Bramhall
Douglas
Eden
Franklin
Holabird
Highmore
Illinois
Lincoln
Loomis
Spring Lake
Union
Valley
William Hamilton

Unorganized territories
 Central Hyde
 Crow Creek
 North Hyde

Politics
Hyde County voters have been reliably Republican ever since South Dakota's statehood. In only two national elections – the Democratic landslides of Franklin D. Roosevelt in 1932 and Lyndon B. Johnson in 1964 – has the county ever voted for a Democratic presidential candidate – although in the Republican landslides of 1956 (due to a major drought and resultant agricultural problems) and 1972 (due to a strong “favorite son” vote for George McGovern) the county actually voted about 4 points more Democratic than the nation at-large.

See also
 National Register of Historic Places listings in Hyde County, South Dakota

References

External links

 

 
1883 establishments in Dakota Territory
Populated places established in 1883